The Kuntsevo Cemetery is a cemetery servicing Kuntsevo, Moscow. It is located on the bank of the Setun River, to the south of the Mozhaisk Highway (the continuation of the Kutuzovsky Prospekt). The local five-domed church was commissioned in 1673 by Artamon Matveyev. The cemetery is administered as part of the Novodevichy Cemetery complex.

Interred

  
 Vsevolod Bobrov,
 Andrei Chabanenko, Soviet naval officer
 Lona Cohen, wife of Morris Cohen, spy
 Morris Cohen, spy
 Leonid Gaidai
 Fedor Gusev
 Tankho Israelov, dancer, choreographer, People's Artist of the USSR
 Valeri Kharlamov
 Mamuka Kikaleishvili
 Leonid Lubennikov, First Secretary of the Communist Party of the Karelo-Finnish Soviet Socialist Republic
 Trofim Lysenko 
 Georgy Malenkov, Premier of the Soviet Union
 Nadezhda Mandelshtam
 Ramón Mercader, assassin of Leon Trotsky
 Mark Naimark, Soviet mathematician
 Kim Philby, English-Soviet double agent
 Iskhak Razzakov, leader of the Communist Party of the Kyrgyz SSR, reburied at the Ala-Archa Cemetery, Bishkek in 2000
 Anatoly Rybakov
 Varlam Shalamov, Russian poet and writer, Gulag survivor
 Larisa Shepitko
 Lyubov Sokolova 
 Glenn Michael Souther (aka Mikhail Yevgenyevich Orlov), a spy inside the United States Navy who defected to Soviet Union
 Paul Tatum, American businessman murdered in Moscow
 Yuri Trifonov
 Nikolai Vinogradov, Soviet naval officer
 Yuri Vizbor
 Kirill A. Yevstigneyev, Major General

References

External links
 

Cemeteries in Moscow
 
Cultural heritage monuments in Moscow